Yangming may refer to:

National Yang-ming University, university in Taipei, Taiwan
Wang Yangming (1472–1529), Chinese Neo-Confucian philosopher
Yangmingism, philosophical school of Neo-Confucianism
Yangming District, district of Mudanjiang, Heilongjiang, China
Yangming Station, metro station in Wuxi, Jiangsu, China
Yangming Mountains, mountain range in Hunan, China